There are two railway stations named for Bethnal Green, east London.

 Bethnal Green tube station on the Central line
 Bethnal Green railway station on the London Overground Lea Valley Lines